Iron County Courthouse may refer to:

Iron County Courthouse (Michigan), Crystal Falls, Michigan
Old Iron County Courthouse, Hurley, Wisconsin
Iron County Courthouse (Missouri), Ironton, Missouri